Silkwood is a 1983 American biographical drama film directed by Mike Nichols, and starring Meryl Streep, Kurt Russell and Cher. The screenplay by Nora Ephron and Alice Arlen was adapted from the book Who Killed Karen Silkwood? by Rolling Stone writer and activist Howard Kohn which detailed the life of Karen Silkwood. Silkwood was a nuclear whistle-blower and a labor union activist who died in a car collision while investigating alleged wrongdoing at the Kerr-McGee plutonium plant where she worked. In real life, her death gave rise to a 1979 lawsuit, Silkwood v. Kerr-McGee, led by attorney Gerry Spence. The jury rendered its verdict of $10 million in damages to be paid to the Silkwood estate (her children), the largest amount in damages ever awarded for that kind of case at the time. The Silkwood estate eventually settled for $1.3 million.

Silkwood was shot largely in New Mexico and Texas on a budget of $10 million. Factual accuracy was maintained throughout the script. One scene in particular involved Silkwood activating a radiation alarm at the plant; Silkwood herself had forty times the legal limit of radioactive contamination in her system.

Streep had just finished filming Sophie's Choice (1982) when production began. The film marked a departure for some of its stars: it is noted for being one of the first "serious" works of Cher, who had been previously known mostly for her singing, and for Russell, who was at the time widely known for his work in the action genre.

The film received positive reviews and was a box office success, with particular attention focused on Nichols' direction and Streep's performance. At the 56th Academy Awards, Silkwood received five nominations in total, including Streep for Best Actress, Cher for Best Supporting Actress and Nichols for Best Director.

Plot
Karen Silkwood, a worker at the Kerr-McGee Cimarron Fuel Fabrication Site (near Crescent, Oklahoma), shares a ramshackle house with two co-workers, her boyfriend Drew Stephens and her lesbian friend Dolly Pelliker. She makes MOX fuel rods for nuclear reactors, where she deals with the threat of exposure to radiation. She has become a union activist, concerned that corporate practices may adversely affect the health of workers. She is also engaged in a conflict with her former common-law husband in an effort to have more time with their three children.

Because the plant has ostensibly fallen behind on a major contract – fabricating MOX fuel rods for a breeder reactor at the Hanford Site – employees are required to work long hours and weekends of overtime. She believes that managers are falsifying safety reports and cutting corners wherever possible, risking the welfare of the personnel. Karen approaches the union with her concerns and becomes active in lobbying for safeguards. She travels to Washington, D.C. to testify before the Atomic Energy Commission. She interacts with union officials who appear to be more interested in the publicity she is generating than her welfare and that of her co-workers.

When Silkwood and other workers become contaminated by radiation, plant officials try to blame her for the incident. When she sees weld sample radiographies of fuel rods being retouched to hide shoddy work, and that records of inadequate safety measures had been altered, she decides to investigate further herself. Complications arise in her personal life when Angela, a funeral parlour beautician, joins the household as Dolly's lover. Unable to deal with Silkwood's obsession with gathering evidence, and suspecting her of infidelities, Drew moves out.

Once she feels she has gathered sufficient documentation, Silkwood contacts a reporter from The New York Times and arranges a nighttime meeting. In the film's final moments Silkwood leaves a union meeting, carrying documentation of her findings on her way to meet with the journalist. She sees approaching headlights in her rear-view mirror. The scene fades out as the lights draw up so close that they distract and blind her, preventing her from seeing the road ahead. The scene fades in again on the aftermath of her fatal one-car crash. There are no documents to be found in the car wreck.

Cast

 Meryl Streep as Karen Silkwood
 Kurt Russell as Drew Stephens
 Cher as Dolly Pelliker
 Craig T. Nelson as Winston
 Fred Ward as Morgan
 Diana Scarwid as Angela
 Ron Silver as Paul Stone
 Josef Sommer as Max Richter
 Charles Hallahan as Earl Lapin
 Tess Harper as Linda Dawson
 Sudie Bond as Thelma Rice
 Henderson Forsythe as Quincy Bissell
 Bruce McGill as Mace Hurley
 David Strathairn as Wesley
 M. Emmet Walsh as Walt Yarborough
 Ray Baker as Pete Dawson
 Will Patton as Joe
 E. Katherine Kerr as Gilda Schultz
 J. C. Quinn as Curtis Schultz

Production
The film was shot on location in Albuquerque and Los Alamos in New Mexico, and Dallas, Howe, Texas City, and Tom Bean in Texas from September 7 to November 26, 1982. Arthur Hirsch and Larry Cano were the producers of the film and received Executive Producer credits. They began working on the movie while graduate film students at UCLA. Their involvement in the making of Silkwood set a precedent in the U.S. Supreme Court regarding the protection under the First Amendment of confidential sources for film-makers, as is done for journalists.

Release

Home media
Anchor Bay Entertainment released the film on DVD in Region 1 on June 15, 1999. Viewers had the option of anamorphic widescreen or fullscreen formats. The Anchor Bay release is long out of print. A Region 2 DVD was released by PT Video on April 8, 2002. A second Region 1 DVD was released by MGM Home Entertainment on October 7, 2003, and a Region 4 DVD was released on October 14, 2004, by MRA Entertainment. It is in anamorphic widescreen format with subtitles in English, Spanish, and French.

The film was broadcast in high definition (1080i) on SkyHD. Silkwood was released on Blu-ray from Kino Lorber on July 25, 2017.

Reception

Box office
The film opened on a limited release in 257 theatres in the United States on December 14, 1983. It grossed $1,218,322 on its opening weekend, ranking #12 at the box office. The film opened widely on January 27, 1984, during which, in its seventh week of release, it had expanded to 816 screens and reached #1. It eventually earned $35,615,609 in the U.S. and Canada.

Critical response
Silkwood received a positive critical response. Vincent Canby of The New York Times called the film "a precisely visualized, highly emotional melodrama that's going to raise a lot of hackles" and "a very moving work." He added, "There are, however, problems, not unlike those faced by Costa-Gavras in his State of Siege and Missing, and they are major. Mr. Nichols and his writers ... have attempted to impose a shape on a real-life story that, even as they present it, has no easily verifiable shape. We are drawn into the story of Karen Silkwood by the absolute accuracy and unexpected sweetness of its Middle American details and then, near the end, abandoned by a film whose images say one thing and whose final credit card another. The muddle of fact, fiction and speculation almost, though not quite, denies the artistry of all that's gone before." He concluded, "I realize that films shouldn't be judged in bits and pieces, but it's difficult not to see Silkwood in that way. For most of its running time it is so convincing—and so sure of itself—that it seems a particular waste when it goes dangerously wrong. It's like watching a skydiver execute all sorts of graceful, breath-taking turns, as he appears to ignore gravity and fly on his own, only to have him smash to earth when the chute doesn't open."

Roger Ebert of the Chicago Sun-Times rated the film four stars and commented, "It's a little amazing that established movie stars like Streep, Russell and Cher could disappear so completely into the everyday lives of these characters."

David Sterritt of The Christian Science Monitor called the film "a fine example of Hollywood's love-hate attitude toward timely and controversial subject matter." He continued, "The movie sides with Silkwood as a character, playing up her spunk and courage while casting wry, sidelong glances at her failings. When it comes to the issues connected with her, though, the filmmakers slip and slide around, providing an escape hatch ... for every position and opinion they offer. This makes the movie less polemical than it might have been, and a lot more wishy-washy ... This is too bad, because on other levels Silkwood is a strong and imaginative film. Meryl Streep gives the year's most astounding performance by an actress, adding vigor and complexity to almost every scene with her endlessly inventive portrayal of the eccentric heroine. The supporting players skilfully follow her lead."

The film holds a 76% rating on Rotten Tomatoes based on 33 reviews, with an average rating of 7.70/10. The consensus reads: "Silkwood seethes with real-life rage -- but backs it up with compelling characters and trenchant observations." It also holds a score of 64 out of 100 on Metacritic.

The American Film Institute included Karen Silkwood as the #47 hero in AFI's 100 Years...100 Heroes and Villains and the film as #66 in AFI's 100 Years...100 Cheers.

Accolades

See also
 The China Syndrome
 Erin Brockovich
 Norma Rae
 Nuclear power
 Nuclear fuel
 Nuclear fuel cycle
 Nuclear security
 Nuclear contamination

References

External links
 
  at MGM.com
 
 
 
 

1983 films
1983 drama films
1983 LGBT-related films
American biographical drama films
American LGBT-related films
Anti-nuclear films
Films scored by Georges Delerue
Films about activists
Films about the labor movement
Films about nuclear technology
Films about whistleblowing
Films directed by Mike Nichols
Films featuring a Best Supporting Actress Golden Globe-winning performance
Films set in Oklahoma
Films set in 1974
Films shot in New Mexico
Films shot in Texas
Mass media portrayals of the working class
Films with screenplays by Nora Ephron
ABC Motion Pictures films
20th Century Fox films
1980s English-language films
1980s American films